Sheila Cecilia Escovedo (born December 12, 1957), known under the stage name Sheila E., is an American percussionist and singer. She began her career in the mid-1970s as a percussionist for The George Duke Band. After separating from the group in 1983, Sheila began a solo career, starting with the release of her debut album in 1984, which included her biggest hit song, "The Glamorous Life". She also saw a hit with the single "A Love Bizarre". She is sometimes referred to as the "Queen of Percussion".

Early life and family
Born in Oakland, California, Sheila E. is the daughter of Juanita Gardere, a dairy factory worker, and percussionist Pete Escovedo, with whom she frequently performs. Her mother is of Creole-French/African descent, and her father is of Mexican-American origin. She was raised Catholic.

Sheila E's uncle is Alejandro Escovedo, and Tito Puente was Escovedo's godfather. She also is niece to Javier Escovedo, founder of seminal San Diego punk act The Zeros. Another uncle, Mario Escovedo, fronted long-running indie rockers The Dragons. She also is the niece of Coke Escovedo, who was in Santana and formed the band Azteca. Nicole Richie is Sheila E.'s biological niece, the daughter of Sheila's musician brother, Peter Michael Escovedo.

She has publicly stated that, at the age of five, she was raped by her teen-aged babysitter, and this event had a profound influence on her childhood development.

Career

1976–1983: Beginnings
Sheila made her recording debut with jazz bassist Alphonso Johnson on "Yesterday's Dream" in 1976. By her early 20s, she had already played with George Duke, Lionel Richie, Marvin Gaye, Herbie Hancock, and Diana Ross. In 1977, she and her father released the album Solo Two. That same year, she joined The George Duke Band. 

She appeared on several of Duke's albums, including Don't Let Go (1978), Follow the Rainbow (1979), Master of the Game (1979), and A Brazilian Love Affair (1980). Along with appearing on Duke's Don't Let Go in 1978, Escovedo and her father released Happy Together that year on Fantasy Records, sharing billing as Pete and Sheila Escovedo. In 1980, she appeared on the pivotal Herbie Hancock album Monster. In 1983, she joined Marvin Gaye's final tour Midnight Love Tour as one of his percussionists.

1984–1989: The Glamorous Life and A Love Bizarre

Prince met Sheila E. at a concert in 1977, when she was performing with her father. After the show he met her and told her that he and his bassist Andre Cymone "were just fighting about which one of us would be the first to be your husband." He also vowed that one day she would join his band. The two would eventually join forces during the Purple Rain recording sessions. She provided vocals to the Prince song "Erotic City" in 1984. Though part of the Prince camp to some degree, she proved to be an artist in her own right as well.

In June 1984, her debut album The Glamorous Life was released on Warner Bros. Records. The album's title-song, "The Glamorous Life", peaked at number 7 on the US Hot 100 and also topped the dance charts for two weeks in August 1984. The video for the song would bring three MTV Award nominations for Best Female Video, Best New Artist, and Best Choreography. She also received two Grammy Award nominations for Best New Artist and Best Pop Vocal Performance Female. The second single, "The Belle of St. Mark", became a moderate hit, peaking at number 34 on the Hot 100. It became NME'''s "Single of the Week". Sheila E. also toured as the opening act for Prince's Purple Rain Tour and the two began a romantic relationship, while Prince was still involved with Susannah Melvoin, twin sister of The Revolution band member, Wendy Melvoin. They would later become briefly engaged in the late 1980s, during Prince's Lovesexy Tour.

In 1985, her second album, titled Romance 1600, was released. It's lead single "Sister Fate" failed to crack the US Hot 100; it peaked at number 36 on the R&B charts. The album's second single, "A Love Bizarre", saw more success, peaking at number 11 on the US Hot 100, becoming her second and last time reaching the US Hot 100 top twenty. The non-album track "Holly Rock" made its way to live shows and into the film Krush Groove. 

In July 1987, her third album, the self-titled Sheila E., was released. The first single, the ballad "Hold Me", peaked at number 3 on the R&B chart. The second single "Koo Koo" peaked inside the top 40 of the R&B chart. Sheila E. later served as Prince's percussionist and musical director during his tours from 1987 to 1989.

Sheila E. has appeared in four films, Krush Groove with Run-D.M.C., LL Cool J, and Blair Underwood in 1985; Prince's concert film, Sign "O" the Times in 1987; The Adventures of Ford Fairlane in 1990; and Chasing Papi in 2003.

1989–1994: Sex Cymbal and Mi Tierra
After leaving the Prince organization in 1989, Sheila E. collaborated with writers like Demetrius Ross and David Gamson, recorded and released an album, Sex Cymbal in 1991. The album spawned the singles "Sex Cymbal", "Dropping Like Flies" and "Cry Baby", although all failed to chart on the Hot 100. She began her tour in Japan which only lasted for a brief time. Shortly after returning to America, she developed severe health issues after her lung collapsed. She described herself as "semi-paralyzed from playing drums in heels for so long".

In 1994, Sheila E. contributed as a guest artist, playing congas and timbales, for the album Mi Tierra by Gloria Estefan.

1996–2005: Music directing

In 1996, she played in Japanese pop singer Namie Amuro's live band. The show at Chiba Marine Stadium was later made available on DVD. In 1998, she played percussion on the Phil Collins cover of "True Colors". She was also the leader of the house band on the short-lived late night talk show, The Magic Hour, hosted by Earvin "Magic" Johnson in the late 1990s.

Sheila E. has performed three stints as one of the member "All-Starrs" of Ringo Starr & His All-Starr Band, in 2001, 2003, and 2006. Her drum "duets" with Starr are a moment of comic relief in the show, where they play the same parts but he quickly falls behind, shrugs and smiles as she takes off on an extended percussion solo. Says Sheila E.: "Ringo truly is one of the greatest rock n' roll drummers in the history of music. He enjoys the joke!"

In 2002, Sheila E. appeared on the Beyoncé song "Work It Out". In 2004, Sheila E. toured New Zealand as drummer and percussionist for the Abe Laboriel Band. The same year, she also was featured on Tonex's Out the Box on the song "Todos Juntos". She also played drums on Cyndi Lauper's hit album of standard covers, At Last. She played percussion on the song "Stay". Sheila E. joined Lauper on a live version of that song on VH1 Divas.

Sheila also performed at Prince's One Nite Alone... Live! concert, Live at the Aladdin Las Vegas in 2003, 36th NAACP Image Awards in 2005, and on the Good Morning show in June 2006. In 2005, Sheila E. was a surprise guest orchestrating a band, in Amerie's "1 Thing" performances for The Lady Of Soul & World Music Awards.

In February 2006, Sheila E. performed with Prince (and Wendy Melvoin and Lisa Coleman) once again at the BRIT Awards. Sheila E. performed at the Sonoma Jazz Festival in 2006 as part of Herbie Hancock's band featuring Larry Carlton, Terrence Blanchard, Marcus Miller, and Terri Lyne Carrington.

2007–2009: C.O.E.D. and reunion with Prince
In 2006, Sheila formed a female group C.O.E.D. (Chronicles of Every Diva), consisting of Sheila E., Kat Dyson, Rhonda Smith and Cassandra O'Neal. The group released a single "Waters of Life". In March 2007, the group went on a successful tour in Europe and Japan. The group toured overseas in 2008 and released a CD available in limited distribution or through her website. For several concerts she was joined by Candy Dulfer, who was billed as a special guest.

She performed at the 2007 Latin Grammy Awards with Juan Luis Guerra. She also performed at the American Latin Music Awards in June 2007 with Prince and on July 7, 2007, in Minneapolis with Prince. She performed at all three of his concerts: at Prince's 3121 perfume launch at Macy's, followed by the Target Center concert, and finally, at an aftershow at First Avenue. In October 2007, Sheila E. was a judge alongside Australian Idol judge and marketing manager Ian "Dicko" Dickson and Goo Goo Dolls lead singer John Rzeznik on the Fox network's The Next Great American Band.

Sheila E. once again teamed up with Prince in March 2008, as she sat in (and played keyboard) on the performance with her family at Harvelle's Redondo Beach. On April 9, 2008, Sheila E. appeared on the Emmy winning program Idol Gives Back. Sheila E. took part in the show opener, "Get on Your Feet", with Gloria Estefan while the So You Think You Can Dance finalists dance troupe joined them on stage. On April 26, 2008, Sheila E., along with Morris Day and Jerome Benton, performed with Prince at the Coachella Music Festival. From May 2 to 6, 2008, Sheila E. played four sold-out shows at Blue Note Tokyo, the most frequented jazz music club in Tokyo, Japan.

On June 14, 2008, Sheila E. performed at the Rhythm on the Vine music and wine festival at the South Coast Winery in Temecula, California for Shriners Hospital for Children. She took the stage with the E Family, Pete Escovedo, Juan Escovedo and Peter Michael Escovedo. Other performers at the event were jazz musician Herbie Hancock, contemporary music artist Jim Brickman and Kirk Whalum.

2009–2012: The E Family
On May 30, 2009, Sheila E. and the E Family Band performed at Rhythm on the Vine at Gainey Vineyard in Santa Ynez, California for the Hot Latin Beats concert. Also performing at the concert was Poncho Sanchez. On December 13, 2009, Sheila E. performed at the Deryck Walcott produced Christmas Jazz held at the Plantation Restaurant in Barbados.

In 2009, Sheila E. participated and won the CMT reality show, Gone Country. This gave her an opportunity to make country music aided by the country producer, writer, and singer John Rich. Sheila E.'s first song in the country market was "Glorious Train". A video for the song debuted on CMT on March 7, 2009, following the airing of the episode of Gone Country in which Sheila E. was announced the winner.

Sheila E. performed two shows at Yoshi's in Oakland, California, on August 15, 2010. At her merchandise stand she sold an EP From E 2 U. It includes a song "Leader of the Band" written by Prince (uncredited, but confirmed by Sheila E.) and it features Prince on piano according to the song's introduction, where he is called by name. She toured on his 20Ten Tour and Welcome 2 America tours. In 2010, Sheila E joined forces with Avon as a celebrity judge for Avon Voices, Avon's first global, online singing talent search for women and songwriting competition for men and women.

On May 25, 2011, Sheila performed alongside Marc Anthony on the 10th-season finale of American Idol. On June 7, 2011, she performed on the Late Show with David Letterman as a part of the show's first "Drum Solo Week". In September 2011, The E. Family consisting of Pete Escovedo, Peter Michael Escovedo III, Juan Escovedo, and Sheila released an album Now & Forever. The album spawned the singles "Do What It Do" and "I Like It".

On February 26, 2012, Sheila performed at the 2012 Academy Awards alongside Pharrell Williams and Hans Zimmer, playing the into and out of commercial segments. On April 17, 2012, Sheila was featured with "Macy's Stars of Dance" on the Dancing with the Stars results show. On June 16, Sheila headlined the 2012 Playboy Jazz Festival at the Hollywood Bowl in Los Angeles, California. Sheila toured in 2012 alongside Sy Smith throughout Europe and the United States. Sheila joined Dave Koz on his 2012 Christmas Tour.

2013–2015: Icon and Beat of my Own Drum

In 2013, Sheila began recording her seventh album. In November 2013, she released her album Icon in the UK. The album was also Sheila's first release of her own recording label Stilettoflats Music. In September 2014, she released her autobiography Beat of my Own Drum. In November 2014, her album Icon was internationally released.

2016–present: Girl Meets Boy
In 2016, Sheila provided drums for Hans Zimmer and Junkie XL's orchestral soundtrack to the blockbuster superhero films Man of Steel and Batman v Superman: Dawn of Justice. On June 26, 2016, Sheila and The New Power Generation led a tribute to Prince on the 2016 BET Awards, featuring a medley of his hits. The next day, she released a new song, "Girl Meets Boy," in honor of Prince.

In 2017 she was the featured percussionist for the soundtrack to the film The Boss Baby, which was also co-produced by Zimmer.

Sheila E. is featured in Fred Armisen's 2018 Netflix comedy special Stand Up for Drummers.

Sheila E. plays percussion on a number of tracks on Gary Clark Jr.'s album This Land''.

She performed and served as music director for Let's Go Crazy: The Grammy Salute to Prince concert at the Staples Center on January 28, 2020. It was broadcast on CBS on April 21, 2020.

On April 17, 2020, she released the single "Lemon Cake" which was available as an audio track on YouTube. On May 14, 2020, Sheila E. premiered the official video for "Lemon Cake" on Rated R&B.

In July 2020, Sheila E. collaborated with MasterClass to create "Sheila E. Teaches Drumming and Percussion"

Honors
In February 2009, she was made an honorary member of Tau Beta Sigma National Honorary Band Sorority by the Eta Delta Chapter located at Howard University in recognition of her humanitarian efforts through and in music. Escovedo and her friend Lynn Mabry are also the co-founder of Elevate Oakland, a nonprofit that uses music and art to serve the needs of youth in Oakland public schools. Sheila E., along with her father, were presented with the Latin Grammy Lifetime Achievement Award in 2021.

Discography

Studio albums

Singles

See also
 List of number-one dance hits (United States)
 List of artists who reached number one on the US Dance chart

References

External links 

 
 
 Sheila E.’s MasterClass

American musicians of Mexican descent
American dance musicians
American women drummers
Living people
Timbaleros
Bongo players
Conga players
American rock percussionists
African-American drummers
American funk drummers
American rock drummers
Rhythm and blues drummers
Soul drummers
American contemporary R&B singers
American soul singers
American funk singers
Warner Records artists
Paisley Park Records artists
Participants in American reality television series
Musicians from Oakland, California
Singing talent show winners
Musicians from the San Francisco Bay Area
20th-century American drummers
21st-century African-American women singers
20th-century African-American women singers
Hispanic and Latino American musicians
The Blackout All-Stars members
1957 births
Ringo Starr & His All-Starr Band members
African-American women singer-songwriters
Latin Grammy Lifetime Achievement Award winners
American performers of Latin music
Hispanic and Latino American women singers
Women in Latin music
Singer-songwriters from California